KRSY may refer to:

 KRSY (AM), a radio station (1230 AM) licensed to Alamogordo, New Mexico, United States
 KRSY-FM, a radio station (92.7 FM) licensed to La Luz, New Mexico, United States

See also 
 Krsy, a municipality in the Czech Republic